Pay Rah-e Chal Balutak (also Romanized as Pāy Rāh-e Chāl Balūţak) is a village in Qaleh-ye Khvajeh Rural District, in the Central District of Andika County, Khuzestan Province, Iran. At the 2006 census, its population was 76, in 12 families.

References 

Populated places in Andika County